{{Automatic taxobox 
| image = Lophostoma.jpg
| image_caption =  White-throated round-eared bat (Lophostoma sylvicolum)
| taxon = Lophostoma
| authority = d'Orbigny, 1836
| type_species = Lophostoma silvicolum| type_species_authority = d'Orbigny, 1836
| subdivision_ranks = Species
| subdivision =Lophostoma brasilienseLophostoma carrikeriLophostoma evotisLophostoma kalkoaeLophostoma occidentalisLophostoma schulziLophostoma silvicolumLophostoma yasuni}}Lophostoma is a genus of Central and South American bats in the family Phyllostomidae.

Species
Genus LophostomaPygmy round-eared bat, Lophostoma brasilienseCarriker's round-eared bat, Lophostoma carrikeriDavis's round-eared bat, Lophostoma evotisKalko's round-eared bat, Lophostoma kalkoaeWestern round-eared bat Lophostoma occidentalisSchultz's round-eared bat, Lophostoma schulziWhite-throated round-eared bat, Lophostoma silvicolumYasuni round-eared bat, Lophostoma yasuni''

References 

)

 
Bat genera
Taxa named by Alcide d'Orbigny